Gamage Don Mahindasoma (born 19 February 1928, date of death unknown) was a Sri Lankan politician who was the first Chief Minister of the North Central Province from May 1988 to May 1996. He was elected in 1977 from Kekirawa to the Sri Lankan Parliament. Mahindasoma was born on 19 February 1928. He is deceased.

See also
List of political families in Sri Lanka

References

1928 births
Year of death missing
Sri Lankan Buddhists
Chief Ministers of North Central Province, Sri Lanka
Members of the North Central Provincial Council
United National Party politicians
Members of the 8th Parliament of Sri Lanka
District ministers of Sri Lanka
Sinhalese politicians